A repertoire is a list or set of works ready to perform, among other meanings
 

Repertoire may also refer to:

 Musical repertoire, a set of prepared musical compositions
 Repertoire Records, a German record label specialising in 1960s and 1970s pop and rock reissues
 Character repertoire, the full set of symbols or graphemes that a particular character encoding can support
 In computing, the instruction set is also known as the "instruction repertoire" 
 Le Répertoire de la Cuisine, commonly called Le Répertoire, a culinary reference book by Louis Saulnier
 Opening repertoire, a collection of a chess player's favoured openings
 James Acaster: Repertoire, a 2018 Netflix show by comedian James Acaster

See also
 REPAIRtoire, a biology database
 Repertory theater, a system of theatrical production and performance scheduling